Elections to Ballymoney Borough Council were held on 21 May 1997 on the same day as the other Northern Irish local government elections. The election used three district electoral areas to elect a total of 16 councillors.

Election results

Note: "Votes" are the first preference votes.

Districts summary

|- class="unsortable" align="centre"
!rowspan=2 align="left"|Ward
! % 
!Cllrs
! % 
!Cllrs
! %
!Cllrs
! %
!Cllrs
! % 
!Cllrs
!rowspan=2|TotalCllrs
|- class="unsortable" align="center"
!colspan=2 bgcolor="" | DUP
!colspan=2 bgcolor="" | UUP
!colspan=2 bgcolor="" | SDLP
!colspan=2 bgcolor="" | Sinn Féin
!colspan=2 bgcolor="white"| Others
|-
|align="left"|Ballymoney Town
|28.5
|2
|20.9
|2
|9.2
|0
|0.0
|0
|bgcolor="#DDDDDD"|41.4
|bgcolor="#DDDDDD"|2
|5
|-
|align="left"|Bann Valley
|bgcolor="#D46A4C"|35.2
|bgcolor="#D46A4C"|2
|24.6
|2
|27.4
|1
|12.8
|1
|0.0
|0
|6
|-
|align="left"|Bushvale
|bgcolor="#D46A4C"|33.1
|bgcolor="#D46A4C"|2
|33.0
|1
|32.7
|2
|0.0
|0
|1.2
|0
|5
|-
|- class="unsortable" class="sortbottom" style="background:#C9C9C9"
|align="left"| Total
|32.7
|6
|26.0
|6
|23.7
|3
|5.3
|1
|12.3
|2
|16
|-
|}

Districts results

Ballymoney Town

1993: 2 x DUP, 2 x UUP, 1 x Independent
1997: 2 x Independent, 2 x DUP, 1 x UUP
1993-1997 Change: Independent gain from UUP

Bann Valley

1993: 2 x DUP, 2 x UUP, 2 x SDLP
1997: 2 x DUP, 2 x UUP, 1 x SDLP, 1 x Sinn Féin
1993-1997 Change: Sinn Féin gain from SDLP

Bushvale

1993: 2 x DUP, 2 x UUP, 1 x SDLP
1997: 2 x DUP, 2 x SDLP, 1 x UUP
1993-1997 Change: SDLP gain from UUP

References

Ballymoney Borough Council elections
Ballymoney